Siemens Financial Services
 OSRAM GmbH - lighting manufacturer, sells under Sylvania- and OSRAM- brands.
 OSRAM SYLVANIA Inc. - US subsidiary; sells lights of various kinds
 Roke Manor Research Limited - Contract research and development in electronic sensors, communications and networks.
 Siemens Airfield Solutions, Inc. - makers of lights for most airports, worldwide; also acts as top level contractor for airport projects
 Siemens Building Technologies Ltd. - building automation, security systems
 Siemens Business Services Media Holdings Ltd.
 Siemens Corporation
 Siemens Building Technologies
 Siemens Healthineers
 Acuson Corporation - ultrasound devices
 CTI PET Systems, Inc.
 Siemens Energy & Automation, Inc.
 Siemens Industrial Solutions and Services Group
 Siemens Information and Communications
 Siemens Telecommunication Services GmbH
 Siemens Enterprise Communications - joint venture with The Gores Group
 Siemens Technology and Services Private Limited
 Siemens Subscriber Networks, Inc.
 Nokia Siemens Networks - joint venture with Nokia, is one of the largest telecommunications solutions suppliers in the world.
 Symbian Ltd.
 Strowger Telecommunication GmbH
 Tri-global Solutions Group Inc.
 Siemens Milltronics Process Instruments Inc.
 Siemens Oil & Gas
 Siemens Power Generation Group
 New Energy Associates, LLC
 Siemens Wind Power
 Siemens Power Transmission and Distribution Group
 Siemens Transportation Systems Group
 Oxford OMT

References
List of Siemens subsidiaries and associated companies
Profiles of Siemens subsidiaries and affiliates
Siemens Announces Agreement to Acquire Dresser-Rand

See also
Lists of corporate assets

Siemens
Siemens
Economy of Germany-related lists